The , or , is a partially completed ticket system toll expressway in Japan. It is owned and operated by the Central Nippon Expressway Company and East Nippon Expressway Company. In conjunction with the Tokyo Bay Aqua-Line and the Bayshore Route of the Shuto Expressway, the expressway will form a full outer ring road of Tokyo. It is signed as National Route 468 as well as C4 under the "2016 Proposal for Realization of Expressway Numbering."

The section owned by the Central Nippon Expressway Company runs from the east end of the Shin-Shōnan Bypass west along the bypass and north to Akiruno Interchange. The rest of the route is owned by the East Nippon Expressway Company.

Route description

The expressway begins at the west end of the Fujisawa Bypass (part of Route 1) in Fujisawa, Kanagawa. From here the expressway is concurrent with the Shin-Shōnan Bypass, which it splits from as that road turns toward the south at Chigasaki.

The Ken-O Expressway then heads north, crossing the Tōmei Expressway and Chūō Expressway. Continuing north, then east. There are junctions with the Kan-Etsu Expressway, Tōhoku Expressway, and Jōban Expressway. It then turns southeast,  where it meets the Higashi-Kantō Expressway east of Narita Airport, there is gap in the expressway here that is planned to be closed. The expressway resumes at Choshu Renraku Road in Tōgane. It crosses the present east end of the Chiba-Tōgane Road, a two-lane expressway. The Ken-O Expressway continues south, looping west to end at the junction of the Tokyo Bay Aqua-Line and Tateyama Expressway.

History
The Ken-Ō Expressway was linked with the Shin-Tōmei Expressway on 28 January 2018.

The smart interchange in Ōamishirasato was opened on 24 March 2019.

Future
Portions of the existing Yokohama-Yokosuka Expressway, Shin-Shōnan Bypass and Chiba-Tōgane Road and the planned Yokohama Ring Expressway will be incorporated into the expressway. In Chiba Prefecture, land acquisition is under way for an  gap in the expressway to be filled. The new segment is expected to reach completion by 2024.

Economic significance
Along with Japan National Route 16, the Ken-Ō Expressway will connect the entire length of the Technology Advanced Metropolitan Area (TAMA) — an inland industrial region covering an area of 3000 km2, in 74 municipalities, and home to over 10 million people of whom 4 million work in the TAMA firms. In 1998 goods shipped from TAMA had twice the shipment value of the Silicon Valley.

Junction list 
Parking areas are appended with PA and smart interchanges are appended with SIC. There are currently no service areas.

|colspan="8" style="text-align: center;"|Through to 

|colspan="8" style="text-align: center;"|Through to

External links

http://www.ktr.mlit.go.jp/honkyoku/road/3kanjo/kenoudo/index.htm
 illustrations of new and planned segments, June 2015 (Japanese) http://www.e-nexco.co.jp/pressroom/press_release/kanto/h27/0424/pdfs/pdf.pdf

References

Expressways in Japan
468
Ring roads in Japan
Roads in Chiba Prefecture
Roads in Ibaraki Prefecture
Roads in Kanagawa Prefecture
Roads in Saitama Prefecture
Roads in Tokyo